San Martín de Escoto located near Soto de Dueñas in the territory of the municipality of Llames de Parres (Parres) in Asturias, Spain. 

The church apparently became linked to an adjacent Benedictine nunnery was once located on the church grounds. It was rebuilt in the 16th century.

See also
Asturian art
Catholic Church in Spain
Churches in Asturias
List of oldest church buildings

References

Churches in Asturias
Romanesque architecture in Asturias